Nelly Nechama Ben-Or Clynes  (née Ben-Or; born 1933) is a concert pianist and professor of music. She is a professor at the Guildhall School of Music and Drama in the United Kingdom where she has taught the piano and the Alexander technique since 1975. Ben-Or is a Holocaust survivor.

Early life
Ben-Or was born in 1933 to a Jewish family in Lwow, Poland (now Ukraine).

During World War II, her family was imprisoned in a ghetto. Her mother, sister and Nelly escaped, but her father did not. When they obtained false identities, she was separated from her sister, who went into hiding and found employment as a domestic servant. Ben-Or and her mother pretended to be Roman Catholics and travelled to Warsaw, where her mother worked for a Christian family for a year as a maid. Having missed the last passenger train to Warsaw, they were placed by the German station master on a train reserved for Wehrmacht officers. The family in Warsaw paid for Ben-Or to have piano lessons along with their own daughter after hearing her play. Occasionally, when people suspected they were Jews, they would be forced to move on, but managed to escape.

Career
A distinguished pianist, and a senior Alexander Technique teacher (in 1963 she became the first pianist to qualify as a teacher of the Alexander Technique), Ben-Or is internationally acknowledged as being the leading exponent of the application of the Alexander Technique to piano playing, in which field she has specialised for more than thirty-five years. She gives master classes on the technique to pianists in many countries throughout the world.

She has performed in concerts and broadcasts throughout the world, in recitals, with orchestra and in chamber music. Ben-Or has made numerous commercial and broadcast recordings, including for the BBC. These recordings cover music by a wide range of composers from the 18th to the 20th centuries.

Moving to England in 1960, she met and married her English husband and later moved to Northwood in London.

In the late 1980s, she taught young Brendan Kavanagh classical piano, helping him complete his Grade 8 theory and practical requirements. He credits his success today as an improvisational classical/boogie-woogie pianist to her support and encouragement of his improvisational style.
 
In 1999, the Nelly Ben-Or Scholarship Trust was established, whose patron is Sir Colin Davis.

Ben-Or was appointed Member of the Order of the British Empire (MBE) in the 2020 Birthday Honours for services to Holocaust education.

References

External links
Her life, in her own words at Northwood Holocaust Memorial Day Events
Ben-Or at the Guildhall School of Music and Drama
 Ben-Or and the Alexander Technique
Ben-Or and the 2008 International Alexander Technique Congress
Nelly Ben-Or website

1933 births
Polish classical pianists
Polish women pianists
Jewish classical musicians
20th-century Polish musicians
Jewish concentration camp survivors
Living people
Polish emigrants to the United Kingdom
Jewish British musicians
21st-century classical pianists
Women classical pianists
People from Lwów Voivodeship
Jews from Galicia (Eastern Europe)
Members of the Order of the British Empire
Naturalised citizens of the United Kingdom
Jewish women musicians
20th-century classical pianists
20th-century Polish women
20th-century women pianists
21st-century women pianists